Tryavna is a town in central Bulgaria, situated in the northern slopes of the Balkan range, on the Tryavna river valley, near Gabrovo. It is famous for its textile industry and typical National Revival architecture, featuring 140 cultural monuments, must and expositions. Tryavna is the birthplace of Bulgarian writer Pencho Slaveykov and revolutionary Angel Kanchev.

The town is the administrative centre of the eponymous Tryavna Municipality. As of December 2009, it has a population of 9,831 inhabitants.

History 

The village was founded as early as the Thracian Era. However, the first documents of its existence date back to the 12th century. In 1190 it was the site of the Battle of Tryavna, which proved crucial in reestablishing Bulgarian independence from the Byzantines. During Ottoman Bulgaria period locals defended the pass and enjoyed privileges for this reason. Only Bulgarians lived in the town. During the period of Bulgarian National Revival, the town was heavily involved in the development of crafts. Houses from this period feature their own architectural design. The ground floors had irregular forms and housed craftsmen and traders. The upper floors featured wooden bow-windows, the roofs were covered with well-arranged rocks.

The town square, named Capitan Diado Nikola, with the clock tower, dating from 1814, are among the landmarks. Another tourist attraction is the "kivgireniyat" bridge, built above the river behind the clock tower. One of the first secular schools in Bulgaria was built on Capitan Diado Nikola Square. Another symbol of Tryavna is the St. Archangel Mihael Church, situated in the town center and built in the late 12th century after Bulgarian tzar Asen defeated Byzantine emperor Isaac II. The wood-carved iconostasis and the bishop's throne in the church are real masterpieces of the woodcarving in Tryavna. Next to the school, is the Raykov house with its ethnographic collection, which is the birthplace of the first Bulgarian chemist, Pencho Nikolov Raikov. Not far away from it is the museum-house of Angel Kanchev who was Vassil Levski's compatriot. One of the most visited museums in Tryavna is the Daskalov house built in 1808. The museum features the famous wood carved suns. The house is a museum of woodcarving and icon painting art. The remarkable ceilings were made after a bet between two of the best masters of wood carving — Dimitar Oshanetsa and Ivan Bochukovetsa. The two masters worked hard for six months in the two largest rooms in the house without having the possibility to see each other's work.

The Petko and Pencho Slaveykov museum-house, situated in the old part of the town, features an exposition of the poetical works of the two authors. The son, Pencho, was nominated for the Nobel Prize but died before having a chance to win it. The Kalinchev house, also in the old part, has been transformed into an art gallery, offering the collection, donated by Totio Gybenski. The Museum of icon painting and woodcarving with its collection of over 160 original icons, painted by well-known masters, is housed in the Tsar's chapel at a distance of the town center.

The unique Museum of Asian and African Art is housed in the old public bath, on the riverside. Tryavna is proud with its great samples of the woodcarving, icon painting and original architecture.

Today the town is a preferred tourist spot, featuring modern hotels, private lodgings and villas, restaurants and taverns.

There is also an Art school where successors of the old icon painters and woodcarvers master these crafts.

The Bulgarka Nature Park is located in the Starina Planina, south on the city.

The town is well connected with the whole country thanks to its excellent road network and railway station.

Besides Bulgarian National Revival figures, another native is former Bulgarian NBA player Georgi Glouchkov.

Population

Administrative partition 
 Svetushka neighborhood
 Kachaun neighborhood
 Hitrevtsi

Education 
 National High School for Applied Arts "Tryavna School"
 Petko Slaveykov's School

Sport 
 FC Tryavna
 Basketball club Tryavna
 Tennis club Tryavna
 Tryavna Ultra
 HV HAMMER TRYAVNA

Gallery

International relations

Twin towns — Sister cities
Since 2011 Tryavna is a member of the Douzelage, a unique town twinning association of 27 towns across the European Union.

Since 1994 Tryavna is also twinned with Brienz, Switzerland.

Honour
Tryavna Peak on Livingston Island in the South Shetland Islands, Antarctica is named after Tryavna.

See also
 Battles of the Russo-Turkish War (1877–1878)
 Bulgarka Nature Park
 Epic of the Forgotten by Ivan Vazov
 Etar Architectural-Ethnographic Complex
 Heroes of Shipka
 History of Bulgaria
 Gabrovo City
 Shipka Memorial
 Shipka Pass

References

External links

 Tryavna municipality's home page
 Tourist information and accommodation
 Hotels in Tryavna
 Facts about Tryavna municipality - cities and villages, maps, population, coordinates
 Tryavna on youtube

Towns in Bulgaria
Populated places in Gabrovo Province